The Jordan Handball Federation is the governing body of handball and beach handball in The Hashemite Kingdom of Jordan. Founded in 1961, the Jordan Handball Federation is affiliated to the International Handball Federation and Asian Handball Federation. The Jordan Handball Federation is also affiliated to the Jordan Olympic Committee, West Asian Handball Federation and the Arab Handball Federation. It is based in Amman.

National teams
 Jordan men's national handball team
 Jordan men's national junior handball team
 Jordan men's national youth handball team
 Jordan women's national handball team
 Jordan women's national junior handball team
 Jordan women's national youth handball team

 Jordan national beach handball team
 Jordan national junior beach handball team
 Jordan women's national beach handball team

Competitions hosted
 2021 Asian Women's Handball Championship
 2018 Asian Men's Youth Handball Championship
 2017 West Asian Women's Handball Championship
 2016 Asian Men's Club League Handball Championship
 2016 Asian Men's Junior Handball Championship
 2014 Asian Men's Youth Handball Championship
 2009 Asian Men's Club League Handball Championship
 2009 Asian Women's Youth Handball Championship
 2008 Asian Men's Junior Handball Championship
 2008 Asian Men's Youth Handball Championship
 2005 Asian Men's Club League Handball Championship
 2002 Asian Women's Junior Handball Championship
 1998 Asian Men's Club League Handball Championship
 1997 Asian Women's Handball Championship
 1987 Asian Women's Handball Championship
 1987 Asian Men's Handball Championship

References

External links
 Official website (Only Arabic Language)
 Jordan Handball Federation at IHF site

Members
1961 establishments in Jordan
Handball
Sports organizations established in 1961
Handball governing bodies